Resurrección is the final album released to date by iconic Mexican pop singer Verónica Castro. The album was produced by A.B. Quintanilla III. All songs were written by A.B. Quintanilla III and Luigi Giraldo.

Track listing
 "Mi Cumbia"  
 "Noche de Amor"  
 "Acapulco"   
 "La Chaparrita Dinamita" 
 "Tonta"   
 "La Descarga"  
 "Resurrección"
 "Di que si"  
 "Un poco Más"  
 "Cómo decir Adiós"

2009 albums
Verónica Castro albums